Charl Justin Timotheus (born 1982) is a South African actor, copywriter, director, producer, screenwriter and content producer. He is best known for his role as Ziggy Arendse in the soap opera Backstage.

Early life
Timotheus was born in Kimberley, South Africa. He graduated with his Bachelor of Arts degree in Film and Drama from the University of Cape Town.

Career
Apart from television, he has appeared in stage plays such as Oedipus Rex, Resurrection of Lazarus, Kopano Residence Play, Charl Timotheus, Between the Lines, and The Passion.

In 2000, Timotheus joined the cast of e.tv. soap opera Backstage with the role Ziggy Arendse. The role became very popular where he played the role until the end of the show in 2007. Since 2005, his own show titled Tjooning was started within the same show Backstage. The show is five minutes long which includes Ziggy's opinion regarding the topic of the day. Besides, there is also a three-minute interview profiling the guest performers. The show made history with this show within the show, becoming the first time in soapie history, where an actor talking straight into camera and communicating with the viewers out there. Apart from Backstage, he also appeared in many television soapies and serials such as; Malan en Kie, Vallei van Sluiers I and II, Get Out Alive and Taryn & Sharon. In 2018, he joined with the cast of SABC2 soapie 7de Laan with the role "Dylan".

He also works as a content producer for Urban Brew Studios, and one of the senior YO-TV producers in charge of live shows.

Filmography

References

External links
 

Living people
Coloured South African people
Male actors from Johannesburg
South African male film actors
South African male television actors
South African male stage actors
University of Cape Town alumni
1991 births